Theorema is a genus of butterflies in the family Lycaenidae.
The members (species) of this genus are found in the Neotropical realm.

Species
Theorema eumenia  Hewitson, 1865  Colombia, Costa Rica, Panama. 
Theorema sapho  (Staudinger, 1888)  Colombia 
Theorema dysmenia  Draudt, 1919 Colombia.

References

Further reading

Funet

Eumaeini
Lycaenidae of South America
Lycaenidae genera
Taxa named by William Chapman Hewitson